Rachel Armitage (née Gowland) is an American politician who served as a member of the Oregon State Senate from the 16th district. She was appointed to the position on January 14, 2022 and did not run for reelection in the 2022 election. She left office on January 9, 2023.

Early life and education 
Armitage graduated from the University of Oregon in 2015 with a Bachelor of Science degree in geography.

Career 
Earlier in her career, Armitage served as a staffer for members of the Oregon Legislative Assembly. She works at Reed College, where she is also studying towards a master's degree. Armitage also serves as a member of the Joint Ways and Means Subcommittee on General Government.

Personal life 
Armitage lives in Warren, Oregon with her husband and step-daughter.

References 

Living people
Democratic Party Oregon state senators
Women state legislators in Oregon
People from Columbia County, Oregon
Year of birth missing (living people)